Transmembrane protein 131-like (TMEM131L protein), alternatively named uncharacterized protein KIAA0922 (KIAA0922 protein), is an integral transmembrane protein  encoded by the human gene KIAA0922 that is significantly conserved in eukaryotes, at least through protists.  Although the function of this gene is not yet fully elucidated, initial microarray evidence suggests that it may be involved in immune responses.  Furthermore, its paralog, prolyl endopeptidase (PREP) whose function is known, provides clues as to the function of TMEM131L.

Gene 

The KIAA0922 gene is found in the human genome at chromosomal location 4q31.3 on the plus strand and is 170,364 base pairs (bp) in length, spanning from 154,387,498 to 154,557,863 along chromosome 4 (NC_000004.11). The gene has the aliases TMEM131L, FLJ10592, DKFZp586H1322, and LOC23240  The gene includes 44 distinct introns (with an additional 6 probable non-overlapping alternative last exons). The function of this gene is not yet fully understood.

The gene includes the Domain of unknown function 3651 (DUF3651) which is part of the transmembrane associated family pfam12371 and of the superfamily cl13764.  The mature mRNA of certain transcript variants have a confirmed signal peptide region. although protein localization remains unknown.

mRNA 

KIAA0922 mRNA is around 5 kilo-base pairs(kbp) in length. Thirteen splice variants are supported by ACEVIEW analysis but only two have been experimentally identified. Mostly, different variants seem to vary based on differing truncation of the 3' and 5' ends (especially due to the presence of an upstream stop codon in the exonic region).

Protein 

Protein TMEM131L is an integral membrane protein and is also known as OTTHUMP00000205136.  The protein TMEM131L Isoform I is 1,610 amino acids in length and its primary structure weighs 179.209 kilo-Dalton (unit) (kDa).  Twelve different isoforms of this protein have been predicted (one partial, six COOH complete, and five complete) however there have been only 5 experimentally observed.

Expression 

The protein TMEM131L shows highest levels of expression in immune related cells and tissues such as lymphocytes and bone marrow.  Levels of TMEM131L protein have been shown to significantly increase under certain immune responses, such as increasing over time after introduction of measles virus to the immune cells dendritic cells and in peripheral blood lymphocytes from kidney transplants displaying acute rejection.

Transmembrane region 

There is only one confirmed transmembrane domain region in protein TMEM131L.  This domain exists near the center of the protein, at 871-891 amino acid of the 1610 amino acid long protein sequence (for isoform I).

There is a dramatic switch from hydrophobic to hydrophilic amino acid density at this confirmed transmembrane region.  There is also a switch to a higher density of predicted N-linked glycosylation sites across this confirmed transmembrane region (0.0136 to 0.0069 predicted N-glycosylation sites/amino acid) at this region. Furthermore, the only confirmed phosphorylation site is on the latter half of the protein (1,123 aa in isoform I) and predicted phosphorylation sites increase in density across the confirmed transmembrane region (from 0.0386 to 0.0905 predicted phosphorylation sites/amino acid).  These results together indicate that the first half of the protein (1-871 aa of isoform I) is outside of the membrane while the second half (891-1610 aa of isoform I) is inside of the membrane, although experimentation is necessary to confirm this deduction.

Paralogs

Prolyl endopeptidase 

The enzyme prolyl endopeptidase (PREP) is 13.4% identical to transmembrane protein 131L. PREP acts in the cytosol by cleaving peptide bonds on the C-terminus of short prolyl residues (approx. 30 amino acids long). PREP has been found to be involved with the maturation and degradation of neuropeptides and peptide hormones. PREP and its general functions are conserved through flavobateria.

Of particular interest, the highest areas of amino acid conservation between PREP and KIAA0922 are the areas most conserved in KIAA0922 (KIAA0922#Conservation) are the esterase lipase region (483...706) and peptidase S9 N region (7...423)

This connection may help direct the efforts to elucidate the function of transmembrane protein 131L.

Transmembrane protein 131 

Transmembrane protein 131L is 36% identical and 54% similar to transmembrane protein 131.  The gene for transmembrane protein 131 is found on chromosomal location 2q11.2 and the protein is 1883 amino acids long and is also an integral membrane protein.  However, research indicates that the TMEM131L protein is more highly methylated than the TMEM protein.

Conservation 

Following Biology Workbench multialign CLUSTAL W analyses, certain regions of TMEM131L protein are highly conserved through Eukaryotes as distantly as single-celled protists (24% identity with Dictyostelium fasciculatum).  These exact same regions also appear to be conserved in the KIAA0922 paralog Prolyl endopeptidase (PREP), a gene for a cytostolic enzyme that cleaves the C-terminus of short polyl proteins.

References